Gangsta Rap may refer to:

Gangsta rap, a style of hip hop music 
Gangsta Rap (album), by Ice-T, 2006
"Gangsta Rap", a 1999 single by Ill Bill
Gangsta Rap, a 2004 novel by Benjamin Zephaniah

See also
Gangsta (disambiguation)